Campbell Station is an unincorporated community in Maury County, in the U.S. state of Tennessee.

History
The community has the name of the local Campbell family of pioneer settlers. A variant name was Fountain Creek. A post office called Fountain Creek was established in 1826, and remained in operation until 1931.

References

Unincorporated communities in Maury County, Tennessee
Unincorporated communities in Tennessee